Lee Ki-ho (Hangul: 이기호, born 17 August 1984) is a South Korean speed skater. He competed for South Korea at the 2010 Winter Olympics in Vancouver, British Columbia, Canada.

Personal records
 500m – 34.59 (16 November 2007, Calgary)
 1000m – 1:08.36 (18 November 2007, Calgary)
 1500m – 1:59.09 (28 December 2002, Seoul)

External links
 skateresults
 

Living people
1984 births
South Korean male speed skaters
Olympic speed skaters of South Korea
Speed skaters at the 2010 Winter Olympics
Speed skaters at the 2007 Asian Winter Games
Medalists at the 2007 Winter Universiade
Universiade medalists in speed skating
Universiade silver medalists for South Korea
Speed skaters at the 2007 Winter Universiade